The following is a list of works by Ameen Rihani

Arabic

Philosophical, literary, social,  and political essays and letters 
 1910 – The Rihani Essays (Ar-Rihaniyyaat) الريحانيات
 1956 (posthumous) – Nationalisms (Al-Qawmiyat)  القوميات
 1957 (posthumous) – Eastern and Western Figures (Wujuh Sharkiya Gharbiya) وجوه شرقية غربية
 1957 (posthumous) – Literature and Art (Adab wa Fan) أدب وفن
 1959 (posthumous) – 
 1961 (posthumous) – Seeds for Planters (Budhur Liz-Zari’een) بذور للزارعين
 1980 (posthumous) – Writings of Early Days (Shadharat Min ‘Ahd-is Siba) شذرات من عهد الصبا
 1982 (posthumous) – My Will (Wasiyati)  وصيّتي

Historical and political analysis 
 1902 – Treatise of the French Revolution (Nubdha fi ath-Thawra al-Faransiya)  نبذة في الثورة الفرنسية
 1924 – Kings of the Arabs (Muluk al-Arab) ملوك العرب
 1928 – Disasters (An-Nakabat) النكبات
 1928 – Extremism and Reform (At-Tatarrof wa'l-Islah) التطرّف والإصلاح
 1928 – The Modern History of Najd (Tareekh Najd al-hadith) تاريخ نجد الحديث
 1934 – Faysal the First (Faysal al-awwal)  فيصل الأوّل
 1935 – The Heart of Iraq (Qalb al-‘Iraq)  قلب العراق

Allegory 
 1903 –

Short story 
 1904 – The Muleteer and the Monk (Al-Makari wa'l-kahen) المكاري والكاهن

Novel 
 1914 – The Lily of Al-Ghore (Zanbakat al-Ghawr) زنبقة الغَور

Literary criticism 
 1933 – You the Poets (Antum ash-shu’ara’)  أنتم الشعراء
 1980 (posthumous) – My Story with May (Qissati ma’a May)   قصتي مع مي

Plays and short stories 
 1934 – Faithful Time (Wafa’ az-zaman)  وفاء الزمان
 1951 (posthumous) – The Register of Repent (Sijil at-tawba) سجل التوبة

Travel 
 1947 (posthumous) – The Heart of Lebanon (Qalb Lubnan)  قلب لبنان
 1952 (posthumous) – The Far Morocco (Al-Magreb al-Aqsa)  المغرب الأقصى
 1952 (posthumous) – The Illumination of Andalusia (Nur al-Andalus) نور الأندلس

Poetry 
 1955 (posthumous) – Hymn of the Valleys (Hutaf al-awdiya)   هتاف الأودية  (free verse in Arabic).
Hymns of the Valleys. Trans. Naji Oueijan. New Jersey: Gorgias Press, 2002.

English

Novels, short stories, and plays 
 1911 – The Book of Khalid
 2001 (posthumous) – Wajdah
 1911–1921 (manuscript) – The Green Flag
 1914 (manuscript) – The Lily of al-Ghore
 1917 (posthumous) – Jahan
 1918 (manuscript) – Doctor Della Valle

Political and cultural  essays and letters 
 1921 – The Path of Vision
 2001 (posthumous) – Letters to Uncle Sam
 2002 (posthumous) – The White Way and the Desert
 2008 (posthumous) – The Pan Arab Movement
 1897–1940 (manuscript) – The English Letters of Ameen Rihani

Poetry 
 1903 – The Quatrains of Abu'l-Ala
 1905 – Myrtle and Myrrh
 1918 – The Luzumiyat of Abul-'Ala
 1921 – A Chant of Mystics, and Other Poems
 2009 (posthumous) – Waves of My Life and Other Poems

Travel writings 
 1930 – Around the Coasts of Arabia
 1930 – Arabian Peak and Desert
 1918–1919 (manuscript) – In the Lands of the Mayas
 1932 (manuscript) – Kurdistan

Historical and political analysis 
 1920 – The Descent of Bolschevism
 1928 – Maker of Modern Arabia or Ibn Saoud of Arabia, His People and His Land
 1967 (posthumous) – The Fate of Palestine
 2008 (posthumous) – The Pan Arab Movement
 1915–1917 (manuscript) – Turkey and Islam in the War
 1932 (manuscript) – Iraq During the Days of King Faisal the First

Art 
 1999 (posthumous) – Critiques in Art

Literary studies 
 2002 (posthumous) – The Lore of the Arabian Nights
 2008 (posthumous) – Arabia’s Contribution to Civilization

Rihani, Ameen